The Moment is an American reality television series that debuted on USA Network on April 11, 2013, and last aired on May 31, 2013. Casting for a potential second season took place prior to the series debut. The series debuted with 1.129 million viewers, with the second episode dropping to 963,000 viewers and its third airing capturing only 950,000 viewers — which led to USA shifting the series to Fridays at 11 pm.

Premise
The Moment chronicles the lives of nine men and women who are nominated by a close friend or family member and surprised by Kurt Warner who gives them the chance to reclaim the career dreams they put on hold when their lives took an unexpected turn. They will endure extensive training by an expert mentor who will prepare them for an audition of the career they've chosen. In the end, they are left with the decision to accept their new job and change their lives forever or keep the career they currently hold and go back to their normal life.

Episodes

References

External links

2010s American reality television series
2013 American television series debuts
2013 American television series endings
English-language television shows
USA Network original programming